Battlestar Galactica is a science fiction video game developed by Warthog Games and published by Universal Interactive for Xbox and PlayStation 2. Although released in 2003, coinciding with the reimagined miniseries, the game itself is based on the original show from 1978.

Gameplay 

During the combat, the performance of all missiles can be adjusted at any time, where the players can balance between speed and power, or blast radius and turning radius. The game judges the player's performance through categories at the end of each mission, and accordingly gives medals for that. Every mission can be replayed for more gold and extras, ranging from various art to certain codes that change the game.

Plot 
The game follows the younger William Adama's career during the First Cylon War, as he battles against the Cylon ships.

Reception

References

External links 
 

2003 video games
Battlestar Galactica games
PlayStation 2 games
Space combat simulators
Video games based on television series
Video games developed in the United Kingdom
Xbox games